Proto-Celtic paganism was the beliefs of the speakers of Proto-Celtic and includes topics such as the mythology, legendry, folk tales, and folk beliefs of early Celtic culture. By way of the comparative method, Celtic philologists, a variety of historical linguist, have proposed reconstructions of entities, locations, and concepts with various levels of security in early Celtic folklore and mythology (reconstructions are indicated by the presence of an asterisk). The present article includes both reconstructed forms and proposed motifs from the early Celtic period.

Deities
{| class="wikitable"
|+
!Proto-Celtic reconstruction
!Ancient
!Goidelic
!Brittonic
!Etymology
!Notes
|-
|*Belenos
|Gaul. Belenus
|
|W Belyn
|Traditionally derived from PIE *bʰelH- ('white, shining'), although this has come under criticism in recent scholarship.
|The river name Bienne and the place name Bienne attest of a feminine form *Belenā. See Belenos for further discussion.
|-
|*Bodwos
|
|OIr. Bodb
|
|From Celtic–Germanic *bhodhwo- ('battle, fight').
|Name of a war divinity. Also attested as a personal name in Gaulish Boduos. A term common to Celtic and Germanic, where a war-goddess is known as Badu-henna. The meaning 'crow', a bird symbolizing the carnage in battle, emerged later in Celtic languages. Middle Irish bodb must be understood as the 'bird on the battlefield and manifestation of the war-goddess'. See Bodb Derg and Badb for further discussion.
|-
|*Brigantī ~ Brigantia
|Gaul. *Brigantia
|OIr. Brigit
|OBritt. Brigantia
|From PIE *bherǵh- ('be high, hill').
See Brigantī, Brigid and Brigantia (goddess) for further discussion.
|-
|*Flitawī
|Gaul. Litaui
|OIr. Letha
|OW Litau, OBret. Letau
|From PIE *plth2wih2 ('the Broad One, i.e. Earth').
|See Litavis and Dʰéǵʰōm (The Broad One) for further discussion.
|-
|*Gobann-
|Gaul. Cobanno
|OIr. Goibniu
|MW Govannon
|From PCelt. *goban- ('smith').
|The Gaulish, Irish and Welsh forms diverge and are reconstructed as *Gobannos, as Gobeniū ~ *Gobanniō, and as Gobannonos, respectively. See Gobannus, Goibniu and Gofannon for further discussion.
|-
|*Lugus
|Gaul. Lugus, CIb. Luguei
|OIr. Lug
|MW Llew
|Unclear etymology.
|At the origin of the PCelt. compound *Lugu-deks ('serving Lugus'; cf. Gaul. Lugudeca, OIr. Lugaid). See Lugus for further discussion.
|-
|*Makwonos
|Gaul. Mapono
|OIr. Macán < *Maccan Oc
|MW Mabon
|An n-stem of PCelt. *makwo- ('son').
|See Maponos for further discussion.
|-
|*Mātronā
|Gaul. Matrona
|
|MW Modron
|An n-stem of PCelt. *mātīr, gen. *mātros ('mother').
|See Matronae for further discussion.
|-
|*Nowdont-
|Nodonti, Nodenti
|MIr. Nuadu|MW Nudd|Unclear etymology.|Nodenti is the dative singular of *Nodens. See Nodens for further discussion. 
|-
|*Ogmiyos|Gaul. Ogmios|MIr. Ogma|
|A yo-derivate of PCelt. *ogmos (perhaps 'path, orbit').
|A mythological name
|-
|*Olo-(p)atīr|
|MIr. Ollathair|
|Identical to PGmc *Ala-fader (cf. Old Norse Alföðr).
|An epithet meaning 'all-father', used as a byname of the Dagda. It can be compared with the Old Norse Alföðr, commonly used for Odin.
|-
|*Tonaros > *Toranos|Gaul. Tanarus, Taranis|  
|OBritt. Tanaro, Pict. Taran|Identical to the Proto-Germanic Thunder-god *Þun(a)raz (Thor). From PIE  *(s)tenh₂- ('thunder').|See Taranis for further discussion.
|-
|*Windos|Gaul. Vindo(nnus)FitzPatrick, Elizabeth; Hennessy, Ronan (2017). "Finn’s Seat: topographies of power and royal marchlands of Gaelic polities in medieval Ireland". In: Landscape History, 38:2, 31. DOI: 10.1080/01433768.2017.1394062
|OIr. Find (mac Cumhaill)|W Gwyn (ap Nudd)|'The White One'. From PCelt. *windo- ('white').
|The male names are considered to be cognates.Ó hÓgáin, Dáithí. The Sacred Isle: Belief and Religion in Pre-Christian Ireland. Boydell & Brewer Ltd, 1999. p. 126. . See Gwyn ap Nudd and Fionn mac Cumhaill for further discussion. Vindonnus appears as an epithet attached to Greek god Apollo in continental Celtic inscriptions. 
|-
|*Windo-sēbrā|
|OIr. Findabair|MW Gwenhwyfar|A compound of windo- ('white') attached to a feminine form of *sēbro- ('demon, spectre').|A mythological name. See Guinevere for further discussion.
|-
| colspan="6" |Note: Gaul. = Gaulish; Gall. = Gallaecian; Lep. = Lepontic; CIb. = Celtiberian; OIr. = Old Irish; MIr. = Middle Irish; OBritt. = Old Brittonic; OW = Old Welsh; MW = Middle Welsh; Pict. = Pictish; OBret. = Old Breton; MBret. = Middle Breton; OCo. = Old Cornish
|}

Entities

Locations

 Other 

See also
Ancient Celtic religion
Celtic mythology
Proto-Germanic paganism
Proto-Indo-Iranian paganism

 References 
Citations

Bibliography

Further reading
 Blažek, Václav. “CELTIC ‘SMITH’ AND HIS COLLEAGUES”. In: Studies in Slavic and General Linguistics 32 (2008): 67–85. http://www.jstor.org/stable/40997494.
 Kalygin, Victor. "Some archaic elements of Celtic cosmology". In: Zeitschrift für Celtische Philologie'', vol. 53, no. 1, 2003, pp. 70-76. https://doi.org/10.1515/ZCPH.2003.70

Ancient Celtic religion